In mathematics, a fusion frame of a vector space is a natural extension of a frame. It is an additive construct of several, potentially "overlapping" frames. The motivation for this concept comes from the event that a signal can not be acquired by a single sensor alone (a constraint found by limitations of hardware or data throughput), rather the partial components of the signal must be collected via a network of sensors, and the partial signal representations are then fused into the complete signal.

By construction, fusion frames easily lend themselves to parallel or distributed processing of sensor networks consisting of arbitrary overlapping sensor fields.

Definition 
Let  be a set of positive scalar weights. Then  is a fusion frame of  if there exist constants  such that for all  we have

,

where  denotes the orthogonal projection onto the subspace . When the lower and upper bounds are equal to each other,  becomes a -tight fusion frame. Furthermore, if , we can call  Parseval fusion frame.

Theorem for the relationship between fusion frames and global frames 

Local frame representation 

,

where  is a dual frame of the local frame .

Definition of fusion frame operator 
Let  be representation space for projection. The analysis operator  is defined by

.

Then The adjoint operator , which we call the synthesis operator, is given by

,

where .

The fusion frame operator  is defined by

.

Properties of fusion frame operator 

,
where  is the identity operator. Therefore, the fusion frame operator  is positive and invertible.

Representation of fusion frame operator 

,

For finite frames (i.e.,  and ), the fusion frame operator can be constructed with a matrix. With

and

.

The fusion frame operator  is then given by an  matrix.

See also 
 Hilbert space
 Frame (linear algebra)

References

External links 
 Fusion Frames

Linear algebra
Functional analysis